Market of Choice is a supermarket chain based in Eugene, Oregon, United States. The store carries conventional groceries, as well as natural and organic products.

History
The Market of Choice stores is owned by Market of Choice, Inc. The company began in 1979 with a single store owned by Richard Wright, Sr. in Cottage Grove, Oregon.  

The company is now run by the founder's son, Rick Wright. Rick reorganized his father's company, which included Price Chopper and Thriftway stores, and created Market of Choice. As part of its rebranding, Price Chopper stores transitioned to the name PC Market and finally to Market of Choice.

By 2011, Market of Choice had seven stores, with four in Eugene and one each in Ashland, Portland, West Linn and Corvallis.  In June 2016, with the opening of a store in Bend, the total grew to ten. In 2017, Market of Choice opened a store at SE 10th and Belmont in southeast Portland. The Belmont store is a retail anchor for the four-building Goat Blocks mixed-use development, which includes 347 residential units and approximately 97,000 square feet of retail space. The most recent addition, in 2020, is a store in Medford. 

The first Market of Choice store outside of the Eugene area, at SW Terwilliger Blvd and Taylor's Ferry Boulevard in Portland, opened in 2002 and closed in April, 2019. Company leadership cited limited parking, increased traffic congestion, and space constraints as reasons for closing.

The company's 50,000 square foot commercial production kitchen and food distribution facility in Eugene opened in 2012. Market of Choice, Inc. also operates Venue 252, a 20,000 square foot events facility opened in 2015 in Eugene.

Local recognition
Market of Choice stores was voted the best grocery store, natural food store, and salad bar in Lane County, in The Register-Guards Readers' Choice awards in 2016. The Eugene stores were also a winner in the dessert category. The Bend Market of Choice store was voted one of the Best Grocery Stores in Central Oregon in 2016 by the readers of Source Weekly.

Environmental Sustainability

In September 2008, Market of Choice removed the use of plastic shopping bags from their stores.

References

Supermarkets of the United States
Companies based in Eugene, Oregon
Retail companies established in 1979
Privately held companies based in Oregon
1979 establishments in Oregon